The 1985 World Archery Championships was the 33rd edition of the event. It was held in Seoul, South Korea on 1–5 October 1985 and was organised by World Archery Federation (FITA).

In this competition, the Korean men's team broke the United States' 26-year reign as champions.

Medals summary

Recurve

Medals table

References

External links
 World Archery website
 Complete results

World Championship
World Archery
World Archery Championships
Sport in Seoul
International archery competitions hosted by South Korea